Pellston Middle/High School is a combined middle and high school in Pellston, Michigan, with a shared principal overseeing grades 6–12 in the Pellston Public School District. The school received a composite grade of B from the Michigan Department of Education, based on several measures of the school's performance for the 2009–2010 school year.

Pellston Middle/High School is considered a Class D school in the Ski Valley Conference. The school serves the Northwest Michigan area, including the townships of Bliss, Burt Lake, Carp Lake, Center, Hebron, Maple River, McKinley, Munro, Pleasantview, Readmond, and Wawatam.

Demographics
The demographic breakdown of the 393 students enrolled for 2013-2014 was:
Male - 46.8%
Female - 53.2%
Native American/Alaskan - 5.4%
Asian/Pacific islanders - 0.5%
Black - 0.5%
Hispanic - 1.0%
White - 79.4%
Multiracial - 13.2%

55.2% of the students were eligible for free or reduced price lunch. The school is also recognized as a Title I school under the Elementary and Secondary Education Act (ESEA), and receives federal funding due to the high percentage of low-income students enrolled at the school.

Attendance boundary
Most of the school district, and therefore the high school attendance boundary, is in Emmet County. There it includes Pellston, Carp Lake, Levering, and portions of Brutus. Townships included are all of Bliss, Center, and McKinley, and sections of Carp Lake, Maple River, Pleasantview, Readmond, and Wawatam. Portions of the district are in Cheboygan County. There it includes Burt Township and portions of Hebron Township and Munro Township.

Hornet Health Center
The Michigan Department of Community Health, in partnership with the Michigan Department of Education, provides grant funds to the Health Department of Northwest Michigan to operate the Hornet Health Center at the school. The Hornet Health Center provides primary care and counseling services to all youth between the ages of 5–21 regardless of income or health insurance coverage. The center's mission is, "to improve the health and well being of young people in Emmet County".

Athletic programs
Pellston Middle/High School offers the following athletic programs:
Girls
Basketball
Softball
Track
Volleyball
Golf
Cross Country
Boys
Basketball
Baseball
Track
Football
Golf
Cross Country

References

External links 
 Pellston Public School District Map - PDF
 Pellston Public Schools - Official Website

Educational institutions established in 1935
Schools in Emmet County, Michigan
Public high schools in Michigan
Public middle schools in Michigan
1935 establishments in Michigan